Loca juventud is a 1965 Spanish and Italian film directed by Manuel Mur Oti.

Cast
Alberto Alonso
Io Apolloni
José María Caffarel
Carlo Campanini
Giove Campuzano
José María Escuer
Joselito
Marisa Merlini
Antonio Moreno
Joaquín Pamplona
Luis Prendes
Jesús Puente
Emilio Rodríguez
Ingrid Simon
María Esther Vázquez

External links
 

1965 films
Spanish drama films
Italian drama films
1960s Spanish-language films
Films directed by Manuel Mur Oti
1960s Spanish films
1960s Italian films